Olympus or Olympos may refer to:

Mountains

In antiquity

Greece 
 Mount Olympus in Thessaly, northern Greece, the home of the twelve gods of Olympus in Greek mythology
 Mount Olympus (Lesvos), located in Lesbos
 Mount Olympus (Euboea), located in Euboea
 Mount Olympus (Attica), located in East Attica
 Mount Olympus (Skyros), located in Skyros
 Mount Lykaion, located in Arcadia

Turkey 
 Mysian Olympus (present-day Uludağ), in northwest Turkey
 Paphlagonian Olympus (present-day Arıt Dağı near Bartın)
 Mount Nif (present-day Nif Dağı in Aegean Turkey)
 Lycian Olympus (present-day Tahtalı Dağı near Kemer)

Cyprus 
 Mount Olympus (Cyprus), the highest point (1952 m) on the island of Cyprus

In modern times

United States 
 Mount Olympus (Washington), on the Olympic Peninsula
 Mount Olympus (Utah), on the Wasatch Front
 Mount Olympus (San Francisco), in the Ashbury Heights neighborhood

New Zealand 
 Mount Olympus, the 2,096-meter mountain range, which contains Mount Olympus Ski Area, located in the South Island of New Zealand

Solar System 
 Olympus Mons (Mars), the tallest known volcano and mountain in the Solar System

Communities

Greece 
 Olympos, Karpathos, a town on the island of Karpathos
 Dio-Olympos, Pieria, a municipal unit in the foothills of the mythic Mount Olympus

Turkey 
 Olympos (Lycia), village in the heart of the Olympos coastal national park

United States 
 Mount Olympus, Los Angeles, a neighborhood in the Hollywood Hills, California
 Mount Olympus, Indiana, an unincorporated place
 Mount Olympus, Utah, a census-designated place

Business
 Olympus Corporation, a Japanese medical and scientific solution company, that previously produced optics and imaging
 OM Digital Solutions, formed when Olympus Corporation split off its photography and audio recording businesses
 Olympus tension leg platform, an oil rig in the Gulf of Mexico
 Rolls-Royce Olympus, a jet engine and marine turbine
 Mt. Olympus Water & Theme Park, Wisconsin Dells, Wisconsin
 Olympus, a codename for the third version of phpBB, phpBB3

Entertainment
 Olympos (novel), a science fiction novel by American author Dan Simmons
 Olympus Rally, a motorsport event in the Washington State, USA
 Olympus (Marvel Comics), a fictional location in Marvel Comics
 Olympus (TV series), a 2015 Canadian fantasy television series
 Mount Olympus, a major location in the 1997 Disney animated film Hercules

Other
 Olympus (musician), two semi-mythical musicians from the time of Ancient Greece
 Olympus (mythology), son of Heracles and Euboea in Greek mythology
 Olympus (sculpture), a public artwork by Charles Ginnever in Milwaukee, Wisconsin, US
 Olympus High School, a high school in Utah, USA
 USS Mount Olympus (AGC-8), a World War II US Navy ship
 Olympus-1, damaged and decommissioned communications satellite
 Optare Olympus, a British double-decker bus
 Olympus, a New Zealand company sailing ship the brought 159 settlers to Wellington, New Zealand, in 1840
 Olympus, an alternate name for Bigelow Aerospace's BA 2100 spacecraft
 FC Olimp Ungheni, the name of the Moldovan football club CS Moldova-03 Ungheni during 2008-2011

See also
Olympe (disambiguation)
Olympia (disambiguation)